Agnes of Loon (1150–1191), was a duchess consort of Bavaria, married to Otto I of Wittelsbach, Duke of Bavaria. She was regent of Bavaria during the minority of her son, Louis I, Duke of Bavaria, from 1183 to 1191.

Life
She was the daughter of Louis I, Count of Loon, and Agnes of Metz. 

She was regent of Bavaria during the minority of her son, Louis I, Duke of Bavaria, from 1183 to 1191. Agnes was described as a forceful regent, who managed to secure the inheritance of her son.

Agnes was a patron of the writer Heinrich von Veldeke.

Issue 
Agnes and Otto had the following children:
 Otto (1169–1181)
 Sophia (1170–1238), married Landgrave Hermann I of Thuringia (1155–1217),
 Heilika I (b. 1171), married in 1184 to Hallgrave Dietrich of Wasserburg
 Agnes (1172–1200), married Count Henry of Plain (d. 1190)
 Richardis (1173–1231), married in 1186 to Count Otto I of Guelders and Zutphen
 Louis I (1173–1231), married in 1204 to Ludmilla of Bohemia
 Heilika II (b. 1176), married Count Adelbert III of Dillingen (d. 1214)
 Elisabeth (b. 1178), married Count Berthold II of Vohburg (d. 1209)
 Mechtild (1180–1231), married in 1209 to Count Rapoto II of Ortenburg (1164–1231).

References
 http://www.guide2womenleaders.com/womeninpower/Womeninpower1150.htm

|-

1150 births
1191 deaths
12th-century women rulers
German princesses
House of Loon
Regents of Germany
12th-century German women